Rino Thunder (October 29, 1933 – September 27, 2003) was an American actor best known for such films and television series as Geronimo: An American Legend, Wolfen, Hot Shots!, Beyond the Law and American Playhouse.

Filmography

References

External links

1933 births
2003 deaths
Native American male actors
American male film actors
American male television actors
American male stage actors
20th-century American male actors